Eucalyptocrinites is an extinct genus of crinoid that lived from the Silurian to the Middle Devonian.  Its remains have been found in Asia, Australia, Europe, and North America.

Sources 

Eucalyptocrinites in the Paleobiology Database

Monobathrida
Prehistoric crinoid genera
Silurian crinoids
Devonian crinoids
Paleozoic echinoderms of Asia
Paleozoic echinoderms of Oceania
Paleozoic echinoderms of Europe
Paleozoic echinoderms of North America
Silurian first appearances
Middle Devonian genus extinctions
Paleozoic life of Ontario
Paleozoic life of Quebec